Sphenomorphus anotus  is a species of skink found in Papua New Guinea.

References

anotus
Reptiles described in 1973
Taxa named by Allen Eddy Greer
Skinks of New Guinea